New Jersey is a state located in the Northeastern United States. According to the 2020 United States Census, New Jersey is the 11th most populous state with  inhabitants but the 5th smallest by land area spanning . , New Jersey is divided into 21 counties and contains 564 municipalities consisting of five types: 253 boroughs, 52 cities, 15 towns, 241 townships, and 3 villages. The largest municipality by population in New Jersey is Newark with 311,549 residents whereas the smallest is Walpack Township with 7 residents.

Like most Northeastern states, all territories within New Jersey are incorporated.

List of municipalities

See also
 List of census-designated places in New Jersey
List of counties in New Jersey

Notes

References

External links
The 10 tiniest towns in New Jersey (they're really small) November 1, 2016

New Jersey
 
Local government in New Jersey
Municipalities
New Jersey
New Jersey
New Jersey